Ed Gold (born June 1969) is a British documentary photographer and photo-essayist who lives off-the-grid, exploring and documenting communities of people who live in remote areas.

Early life and education
Gold has an MA in Interactive Multimedia from Central Saint Martins.  

While he was in graduate school he was homeless. After he graduated he worked at odd jobs and as a labourer. During that time he started teaching himself photography.  He was working as a security guard in 2002 when he quit in order to become a full time photographer.  He has since chosen to forego a home base to live among the communities he documents.

Photojournalism projects 
Gold freelances for the BBC, with which he works on photography projects. When he documents a particular group of people, he embeds himself within their community for long durations, sometimes for up to three years.

Gold has spent time living amongst the Iñupiat people in Wales, Alaska; with residents of Galena, Alaska, who live near the Arctic Circle; and with the Atchley family, who live in a remote area with no contact with the outside world apart from when they visit town once a year. While in the USA, he documented Harley-Davidson enthusiasts at the House of Harley in Anchorage and the US Army at the Northern Warfare Training Center.

Gold has made four visits to the British Columbian First Nation reservation Prophet River where the Dane-zaa (historically referred to as the Beaver tribe by Europeans), are an Athabaskan-speaking group of First Nations people. His methods involve recording the experiences of those who live there, with associated portrait photography.

In 2011, on a visit to Donetsk in the Ukraine, where he had come to look for traces of immigrants from Wales who had founded the city, Gold witnessed a group of pensioners in Donetsk town square, who were protesting about their pensions being cut. At the time of this photograph, one pensioner who had been on hunger strike had already died.

Gold spent July 2010 to July 2011 embedded with the 2nd Battalion, Parachute Regiment (2 Para), both at their base in Colchester and on the ground in Afghanistan. He followed the men from a single platoon before, during and after a tour of duty. In 2018 he returned to investigate how some of the lives of the young soldiers he had met had changed. One soldier who had first enlisted at age 15 lost both legs while on active service and Gold's work documents his time in the army and thereafter.

Gold lived and worked for a total of three years in Patagonia, in a community made up of descendants of Welsh people who arrived there in 1865. The main published output of this stay was the work Welsh Patagonia. A copy is now stored in the British Library collection of artists’ books.

Gold documented communities living off-grid in the UK when he visited Tinkers Bubble in Somerset.

Gold publishes a magazine called Positive Futures, which documents off-grid and alternative lifestyles.

Solo exhibitions
1997: Essex Country Folk, Colchester Institute
2003: Life as it is, Canolfan Beaumaris, Isle of Anglesey
2004: Anglesey Bikers & Landscapes, Canolfan Ucheldre, Holyhead
2004: Best of Wales, The Gallery, Mayfair, London
2004: Wales Steaming Ahead, Bangor Museum
2005: Language of Heaven in the Land of Song, Blaenau Ffestiniog
2005: Anglesey Characters, Theatr Gwynedd, Bangor, Gwynedd
2005: Positive Futures, Caernarfon Library, North Wales
2006: Gente del Valle, Concejo Deliberante, Gaiman, Chubut
2007: Gente del Valle, Muestra Agropecuaria, Gaiman Chubut
2007: Gente del Valle, Oriel Ynys Môn, Anglesey
2008: Antiguos Hogares, Museo Municipal de Artes Visuales, Trelew
2008: Retratos de Mar y el Valle, Municipal de Arte, Puerto Madryn
2011: People: Pashtuns & Paras, Essex Record Office, Chelmsford
2017: Ed Gold: Other Worlds, Firstsite, Colchester

Publications
 Patagonia: Byd Arall / Otro Mundo / Another World. Publisher: Gomer Press, Llandysul, UK 2012. 
 Wales: Portrait of an Alaska Village. Publisher: VP & D House, Anchorage, USA 2014. 
 Welsh Patagonia. Publisher: Fox Ash Press, Lawford, UK 2016. 
 Yuendumu. Publisher: Blurb, 2018

References 

Social documentary photographers
1969 births
Living people
Alumni of Central Saint Martins
Photographers from London